Peng Zhen (pronounced ; October 12, 1902 – April 26, 1997) was a leading member of the Chinese Communist Party. He led the party organization in Beijing following the victory of the Communists in the Chinese Civil War in 1949, but was purged during the Cultural Revolution for opposing Mao's views on the role of literature in relation to the state. He was rehabilitated under Deng Xiaoping in 1982 along with other 'wrongly accused' officials, and became the inaugural head of the Central Political and Legal Affairs Commission.

Biography

Born in Houma, Shanxi province, Peng was originally named Fu Maogong (傅懋恭). He joined the Chinese Communist Party (CCP) in 1923 as a founding member of the Shanxi Province CCP. Arrested in 1929, he continued underground political activities while imprisoned. He was released from prison in 1935 and began organizing a resistance movement against the invading Japanese forces. Around the same time, he was appointed the Organization Department Director of the North Bureau of CCP. He also served on a number of positions as vice-president of the Central Party School and director of the CCP Policy Research Office. In 1945 he served in the history research committee and the organizing committee of the Communist Party's 7th National Congress.

In September 1945 Peng was sent by Mao Zedong to take up overall leadership of the Communists in Northeast China. He was accompanied by Lin Biao who was to assist Peng with directing military operations against the Nationalists. Peng decided that the Communists could hold the 3 big cities of the Northeast: Shenyang, Changchun and Harbin. When the Nationalists under the command of Du Yuming attacked in November 1945, the Communists were forced back. Peng was removed as Communist leader in the northeast after further failure by Lin Biao's forces in March 1946 led to the Communists retreat back to Harbin.

Peng was a member of the CCP Central Committee starting from 1944 as well as member of the Secretariat of the CCP Central Committee. He also held the positions of First Secretary of the Beijing Municipal Committee, and Mayor of Beijing (1951). He was a member of the Politburo from 1956 to 1966.In June 1960, he attended Bucharest Conference of Representatives of Communist and Workers Parties, countering Soviet leader Khrushchev during the conference.

Peng was appointed head of the Five Man Group in charge of preparing a "cultural revolution", but he fell out of favor with Mao Zedong in April 1966 when he attacked Mao's belief that all literature should support the state. He was accused of being an associate to Wu Han's counter-revolutionary clique and deposed at a May 1966 conference in what became the opening act of the Cultural Revolution. Lu Dingyi, Luo Ruiqing and Yang Shangkun were also deposed.

Peng survived the Cultural Revolution, and was eventually rehabilitated under Deng Xiaoping. He subsequently became Secretary of the Central Political and Legal Affairs Commission, a post he already held from late 1950s in the capacity of leader of a Central Politics and Law Leading Group. Beginning in 1983, as Chairman of the Standing Committee of the Sixth National People's Congress, he sought to increase the NPC's power. Peng retired from his leading political positions in 1988.

Peng Zhen died on April 26, 1997, from blood cancer at age of 94 years old, two months after the death of former vice premier Deng Xiaoping, and was eulogized with high honours by the highest organs of the party and the state. His official obituary declared him a "great proletarian revolutionary, politician, and outstanding expert in the affairs of the state; unswerving Marxist, instrumental in laying the foundations of legal institution in our country, and excellent leader of the party and state." The obituary also curiously made mention of his support of Deng Xiaoping's 1992 "southern tour" which re-ignited economic reforms after relative stagnation following the 1989 Tiananmen Square protests and massacre.

He was considered one of the Eight Elders of the CCP.

References

Citations

Sources 

 Original text based on marxists.org article (GNU FDL)

Further reading 
 Pitman B. Potter, From Leninist Discipline to Socialist Legalism: Peng Zhen on Law and Political Authority in the PRC, Stanford University Press; 1 edition (March 13, 2003), hardcover: 272 pages,

External links 
 .
The Peng Zhen Reference Archive

|-

|-

|-

|-

|-

|-

|-

1902 births
1997 deaths
Politicians from Linfen
Victims of the Cultural Revolution
Chinese Communist Party politicians from Shanxi
Chairmen of the Standing Committee of the National People's Congress
Vice Chairpersons of the National Committee of the Chinese People's Political Consultative Conference
Mayors of Beijing
People's Republic of China politicians from Shanxi
Members of the Secretariat of the Chinese Communist Party
Members of the 12th Politburo of the Chinese Communist Party
Members of the 11th Politburo of the Chinese Communist Party
Members of the 8th Politburo of the Chinese Communist Party
Members of the 7th Politburo of the Chinese Communist Party
Burials at Babaoshan Revolutionary Cemetery